Southwestway Park is the third largest park in Indianapolis, Indiana.

History
In the late 1950s and early 1960s, the Indianapolis Parks Department began efforts to develop large regional parks in each quadrant of Marion County. To that end, it obtained  of farmland between Mann Road and the White River,  of which were developed in 1968 into a 9-hole municipal golf course.

In 1968 the city bought an additional  on both sides of Mann Road north of the golf course. At the time it was anticipated that the area would continue to be used, as it had been when privately owned, for off-road motorcycling; however, environmental concerns prevented that from happening. In late 1984 the city obtained another  between Mann Road and the White River north of the 1968 purchase. The total acreage at that time was  including the golf course.

By 2004, the golf course, now known as Winding River Golf Course, had been expanded into an 18-hole, par-72 facility with a driving range, covering . The park itself contained .

Park activities and buildings 
 Hiking trails
 Mountain biking trails
 Horseback riding trails
 Playground
 Shelter (1)
 Soccer fields (8)
 Baseball/softball diamonds (3)
 Winding River Golf Course (18-hole course + driving range)

Natural areas
Southwestway Park contains some of the most outstanding geological features in central Indiana. Some of the most notable features include:

Floodplain forest
Mesic upland forest
Graminoid fen
 Successional fields
 Cottonwood Lake
Kame
White River

A pair of bald eagles have hatched young near the White River in Southwestway Park.

See also
List of parks in Indianapolis

References

External links 

 

Urban public parks
Parks in Indianapolis